Satoru Uyama (宇山 賢, Uyama Satoru, born 10 December 1991) is a Japanese right-handed épée fencer, 2016 team Asian champion, and 2021 team Olympic champion. 

Along with Koki Kano, Masaru Yamada, and Kazuyasu Minobe, Uyama was a member of the Japanese team that won gold in the team men's épée event at the 2020 Tokyo Olympic Games. It was Japan's first Olympic gold medal in fencing.

Medal Record

Olympic Games

Asian Championship

World Cup

References

External links 
 

Living people
1991 births
People from Takamatsu, Kagawa
Japanese male épée fencers
Fencers at the 2018 Asian Games
Medalists at the 2018 Asian Games
Asian Games gold medalists for Japan
Asian Games medalists in fencing
Olympic fencers of Japan
Fencers at the 2020 Summer Olympics
Olympic gold medalists for Japan
Medalists at the 2020 Summer Olympics
Olympic medalists in fencing
20th-century Japanese people
21st-century Japanese people